Sir David Gerald Scholey   (born 28 June 1935) is a British merchant banker. He is the former chairman and chief executive of S. G. Warburg and was a director of the Bank of England from 1981 to 1998. He is a former governor of the BBC, and a former chairman of the board of trustees of the National Portrait Gallery.

Early life
Scholey was born in Surrey, the son of Dudley Scholey and Lois Hammon. He was educated at Wellington College and Christ Church, Oxford.

Career
Scholey is the former chairman and chief executive of S. G. Warburg. He was a director of the Bank of England from 1981 to 1998. He is a former governor of the BBC, and a former chairman of the board of trustees of the National Portrait Gallery (2001–05). He was non-executive deputy chairman of Anglo American from 1999 to 2001 and has been a director of Sainsbury's Bank.

Scholey was criticized by animal rights groups for shooting a lion during a hunt in Africa.

Personal life
Scholey married Alexandra Beatrix Drew, daughter of Hon. George Drew, and has a son, Christopher, and daughter, Fiorenza.

References 

1935 births
Living people
British bankers
S. G. Warburg & Co. people
People associated with the Bank of England
Knights Bachelor
Commanders of the Order of the British Empire